Edgar Eugene Joralemon (1858–1937) was an architect in the U.S. The Drum Hill High School and Dunkirk School Number 7 are among the buildings he designed that are listed on the National Register of Historic Places.

He worked in Minnesota and then Upstate New York.

He replaced Harvey Ellis as Leroy S. Buffington's chief draftsman. Joralemon partnered with Fremont D. Orff from 1893 until 1897.

Work
William W. And Louise McNair House (1886), a mansion in Minneapolis razed in 1961
Henry E. Holmes House (1887) in Minneapolis
George W. and Nancy B. Van Dusen House (1893) at 1900 LaSalle Avenue in Minneapolis
North Tonawanda Carnegie Library (1903) at 240 Goundry Street in North Tonawanda, New York
Niagara Falls Public Library (1904 Carnegie Building) at 1022 Main Street in Niagara Falls, New York
Drum Hill High School (1909) on Ringgold Streer in Peekskill, New York
Depew High School (1914) in Depew, New York
Dunkirk School Number 7 (1921) at East Lake Shore Drive and North Serval Street in Dunkirk
Roswell P. Flower Memorial Library at 229 Washington Street in Watertown, New York (Orchard, Lansing & Joralemon)
Ivers J. Norton Elementary School
Knox Mansion (Buffalo, New York)

References

1858 births
1937 deaths
19th-century American architects
20th-century American architects